Barkin' Bill Smith (August 18, 1928 – April 24, 2000) was an American Chicago blues and electric blues singer and songwriter. He was born in Cleveland, Mississippi, and in his latter years lived in Chicago.

Biography
Smith was raised in Mississippi and later relocated to East St. Louis, Detroit and finally Chicago. He obtained his stage name from Homesick James in 1958, after the pair had worked together. Smith sang in front of various blues bands around Chicago for many years. He was initially influenced by Joe Williams, Jimmy Witherspoon and Brook Benton. He made his recording debut in 1991, singing on Dave Specter's first album, Bluebird Blues. Delmark Records issued Smith's solo debut album, Gotcha!, in 1994, with Steve Freund playing guitar.

In his latter years declining health restricted his live appearances.

Smith died of pancreatic cancer in Chicago in April 2000, at the age of 71.

Solo album discography
Gotcha! (1994), Delmark

See also
List of Chicago blues musicians
List of electric blues musicians

References

1928 births
2000 deaths
American blues singers
Songwriters from Mississippi
Chicago blues musicians
Electric blues musicians
Singers from Mississippi
Deaths from pancreatic cancer
Deaths from cancer in Illinois
20th-century American singers
Blues musicians from Mississippi
Songwriters from Illinois
20th-century American male singers
American male songwriters